Goryunov (from горюн meaning a grieving person) is a Russian masculine surname, its feminine counterpart is Goryunova. It may refer to:

Ivan Goryunov (born 1988), Russian football player
Sergey Goryunov (born 1958), Russian association football coach and former player
Victor Goryunov, Russian mathematician

See also
SG-43 Goryunov, a Soviet medium machine gun

References

Russian-language surnames